Huo Jun ( 178–217), courtesy name Zhongmiao, was a military general serving under the warlord Liu Bei in the late Eastern Han dynasty of China. Liu Bei thought very highly of Huo Jun and in a letter to Zhuge Liang praised him as a great warrior with many achievements. When Huo Jun died, Liu Bei deeply mourned him, led his officials during his burial and stayed overnight at his tomb which was a great honor.

Life
Huo Jun was from Zhijiang County, Nan Commandery, Jing Province, which is in present-day Zhijiang, Hubei. His elder brother, Huo Du, rallied a few hundred men from their hometown to form a militia. After Huo Du's death, Liu Biao, the Governor of Jing Province, put Huo Jun in command of the militia. When Liu Biao died in late 208, Huo Jun led his followers to join the warlord Liu Bei, who previously took shelter under Liu Biao. Liu Bei appointed Huo Jun as a General of the Household.

Around 211, Liu Bei led an army from Jing Province to Yi Province (covering present-day Sichuan and Chongqing) to assist the provincial governor Liu Zhang in countering a rival warlord, Zhang Lu, in Hanzhong Commandery. In 212, when conflict broke out between Liu Bei and Liu Zhang, the former led his forces from Jiameng to attack the latter, leaving behind Huo Jun to defend Jiameng. At the same time, Zhang Lu sent his general Yang Bo to entice Huo Jun to defect to Zhang Lu, by offering to defend Jiameng together with him. Huo Jun replied Yang Bo, "You can take a xiaoren'''s head but not a fortress." Yang Bo therefore retreated.

Later, Liu Zhang sent his officers Fu Jin, Xiang Cun and others to lead an army of ten thousands soldiers to attack Jiameng. Huo Jun had only a few hundred troops with him but he managed to hold his position for a year. When he saw that the enemy was weak and negligent, he selected elite soldiers from among his men and launched a counterattack on Liu Zhang's forces, greatly defeated them and beheading Xiang Cun in battle.

In early 214, Liu Zhang surrendered to Liu Bei, after which Yi Province came under the latter's control. In recognition of Huo Jun's contributions during the campaign, Liu Bei partitioned a new commandery, Zitong, from the original Guanghan Commandery, and appointed Huo Jun as the Administrator of Zitong. Huo Jun was also promoted to the rank of a Major-General. He held office for three years before dying at the age of 40 (by East Asian age reckoning). His body was transported to Chengdu (the capital of Yi Province) for burial. Liu Bei deeply lamented Huo Jun's death and personally led his subjects to offer sacrifices and attend Huo's funeral.

Family
Huo Jun's son, Huo Yi, continued serving Liu Bei and became a general in the state of Shu Han (founded by Liu Bei) during the Three Kingdoms period.

See also
 Lists of people of the Three Kingdoms

References

 Chen, Shou (3rd century). Records of the Three Kingdoms (Sanguozhi'').

Liu Biao and associates
178 births
217 deaths
Generals under Liu Bei
Officials under Liu Bei
Politicians from Yichang
Han dynasty politicians from Hubei
Political office-holders in Sichuan
Han dynasty generals from Hubei